Eterniti Motors was a short-lived British company founded in 2010 and placed in administration in January 2014.

It unveiled its first and only car, the Hemera, at the 2011 Frankfurt Motor Show. In 2012 the Hemera was shown in China at the Beijing International Automotive Exhibition as the Artemis.

Models

Initially called the Hemera, Eterniti Motor's only vehicle was renamed Artemis when shown at the 2012 Beijing Motor Show.

The Artemis has been named the world’s first Super-SUV, extensively modifying the Porsche Cayenne with new carbon composite body panels and ultra-low profile 315/25 tyres that sit on large 23" super-lightweight forged alloy rims. The standard specification features twin electric reclining seats in the rear, a choice of starlight roof lining or panoramic glass roof, quilted undercarpets and boot trim, lambswool rugs, electronic-reveal iPads, and a drinks chiller.

Company history
The company is formally registered as Eterniti Motors Limited and was registered in September 2010. Its first public announcement was not until 16 August 2011. Eterniti Motors is backed by a group of international investors with collective experience in high-level luxury automobiles. 
The company listed Alastair Macqueen, a former XJ220 developer as its Chief Engineer, Tim Sugden as interim General Manager, and Mark Carbery formerly of Lexus as Head of Brand and Communications. Former Formula One driver Johnny Herbert was briefly mentioned as developing and promoting the vehicle.

See also
 List of companies based in London
 List of car manufacturers of the United Kingdom

References

External links
Official Eterniti Motors website

Car manufacturers of the United Kingdom
Defunct companies based in London
Luxury motor vehicle manufacturers
Vehicle manufacturing companies established in 2010
Vehicle manufacturing companies disestablished in 2014
British companies established in 2010
2010 establishments in England
2014 disestablishments in England
2010 in London
Defunct motor vehicle manufacturers of England